Heo Nanseolheon (1563 – 19 March 1589), was a Korean painter and poet of the mid-Joseon dynasty. She was the younger sister of Heo Bong, a politician and political writer, and elder to Heo Gyun, a prominent writer of the time and credited as the author of The Tale of Hong Gildong. Her own writings consisted of some two hundred poems written in Chinese verse (hanshi), and two poems written in hangul (though her authorship of the hangul poems is contested).

Biography

Early life 
Before being known as Heo Nanseolheon, Lady Heo was known by her name Heo Cho-hui (허초희, 許楚姬) or Heo Ok-hye (허옥혜, 許玉惠). Lady Heo was born in Gangneung to a prominent political family (yangban). Her father, was from the Yangcheon Heo clan and a distinguished scholar who fathered her by his second wife, Lady Kim of the Gangneung Kim clan. His first wife, Lady Han of the Cheongju Han clan, was a daughter of Han Suk-chang, who yielded five daughters and three sons. Her step-grandfather, Han Suk-chang, was a great-grandson of Han Hwak (the father of Princess Consort Jeongseon and Queen Sohye), and the cousin of Queen Janggyeong. His second marriage was to a daughter of a political minister, who mothered Nanseolheon and her two brothers. While her father was a Confucian and conservative official who subscribed tightly to the belief of namjon-yubi ("men above, women below"), it fell to her elder brother, Heo Bong, to recognize her budding talent and curiosity and introduce her to literature.

From an early age, she became recognized as a prodigal poet, though due to her position as a woman she was incapable of entering into a position of distinguishment. Her early piece, "Inscriptions on the Ridge Pole of the White Jade Pavilion in the Kwanghan Palace" (Kwanghanjeon Paegongnu sangnangmun), produced at the age of eight, was lauded as a work of poetic genius and earned her the epithet "immortal maiden." Her innate talent for hanmun (Chinese) verse prompted him to be her first tutor in her early years, and introduce her to Chinese writing, such as the Confucian Five Classics.

However, Heo Bong was also an outspoken and influential political scholar and was eventually exiled to Kapsan for three years for his political leanings. Her younger brother, Heo Gyun, was a similarly gifted poet who studied under , a specialist of Tang poetry and a friend of Heo Pong, and he took part in her education, especially after her elder brother's exile. He fostered her education later in life and used his preferred position as a highly respected male to keep her in correspondence with literary circles. Yi Tal, his tutor, also engaged in sharing Tang poetry with Nanseolheon, whose influence became visible in the naturalism of a significant portion of her surviving work.

Marriage 
Sometime during her life, she married the son of a civil official, Kim Seong-rip. Her marriage was an unhappy one, as recorded by Heo Gyun. Her husband often left her alone at home to pursue other women, and she maintained a cold relationship with her mother-in-law. She gave birth to two children, a girl and a boy. Her daughter died almost as soon as she was born, while her son died after living about 1 year. Within a year of her elder brother Heo Pong's death in Kapsan, she died of illness at the age of twenty-seven.

The circumstances and timing of her marriage are uncertain, and the documented proof is limited and subject to conjecture. Scholars such as Kim-Renaud and Choe-Wall engage with her literature and hypothesize that she lived among her brothers for a significant portion of her life (during which they suggest most of her Tang-influenced and naturalistic poetry was produced), and married later. She suggests that the body of her "empathetic" poetry was produced after being married, as a result of the isolation from those who supported her literary talents and extended poetic circles. This conjecture is based on the observation that a significant portion of what is believed to be her later literature laments the plight and sufferings of married women, and her early literature follows closely in the Tang tradition, employing heavy elements of folklore and natural imagery rather than the heavier emotive language found in her later writing.

Family 
 Great-Great-Great-Grandfather
 Heo Chu (허추, 許樞)
 Great-Great-Grandfather
 Heo Gal (허갈, 許葛)
 Great-Grandfather
 Heo Dam (허담, 許聃)
 Grandfather 
 Heo Han (허한, 許澣) (? - 1532)
 Grandmother 
 Lady Seong of the Changnyeong Seong clan (창녕 성씨) (? - 1557)
 Father 
 Heo Yeob (허엽, 許曄) (19 December 1517 - 4 February 1580)
 Mother
 Lady Kim of the Gangneung Kim clan (정부인 강릉 김씨)
 Maternal Grandfather: Kim Gwang-cheol (김광철, 金光轍)
 Stepmother: Lady Han of the Cheongju Han clan (정부인 청주 한씨)
 Maternal step-grandfather: Han Suk-chang (한숙창, 韓叔昌) (1478 - 1537)
 Maternal step-grandmother: Lady Yi of the Jeonju Yi clan (전주 이씨)
 Siblings 
 Older half-brother: Heo Seong (허성, 許筬) (1548 - 1612)
 Sister-in-law: Lady Yi of the Jeonju Yi clan (전주 이씨)
 Lady Heo of the Yangcheon Heo clan (양천 허씨, 陽川 許氏); died prematurely 
 Sister-in-law: Lady Nam of the Uiryeong Nam clan (의령 남씨)
 Half-Nephew: Heo Sil (허실, 許實)
 Half-Nephew: Heo Bo (허보, 許寶)
 Half-Nephew: Heo Shin (허신)
 Half-Niece: Lady Heo of the Yangcheon Heo clan (양천 허씨, 陽川 許氏)
 Nephew-in-law: Hong Yeong (홍영, 洪榮)
 Half-Niece: Princess Consort Heo of the Yangcheon Heo clan (군부인 양천 허씨, 陽川郡夫人 陽川 許氏)
 Nephew-in-law: Yi Gwang, Prince Uichang (의창군 이광, 義昌君 李珖) (1589 - 1645)
 Adoptive half-grandnephew: Yi Il, Prince Changrim (창림군 이일, 昌臨君 李佾) (1629 - 1690)
 Older half-sister: Lady Heo of the Yangcheon Heo clan (양천 허씨, 陽川 許氏)
 Brother-in-law: Park Sun-won (박순원, 朴舜元)
 Older half-sister: Lady Heo of the Yangcheon Heo clan (증정부인 양천 허씨)
 Brother-in-law: Woo Seong-jeon (우성전, 禹性傳) (1542 - 1593)
 Older brother: Heo Bong (허봉, 許篈) (1551 - 1588)
 Sister-in-law: Lady Yi of the Jeonju Yi clan (숙인 전주 이씨); daughter of Yi Woo-bin (이우빈, 李禹賓)
 Nephew: Heo Chae (허채, 許寀)
 Nephew: Heo Sang (허상)
 Niece: Lady Heo of the Yangcheon Heo clan (양천 허씨, 陽川 許氏)
 Younger brother: Heo Gyun (허균, 許筠) (10 December 1569 - 12 October 1618)
 Sister-in-law: Lady Kim of the Andong Kim clan (정부인 안동 김씨)
 Unnamed nephew (1592 - 1592)
 Unnamed nephew 
 Niece: Lady Heo of the Yangcheon Heo clan (양천 허씨, 陽川 許氏)
 Nephew-in-law: Lee Sa-seong (이사성, 李士星)
 Grandnephew: Lee Pil-jin (이필진, 李必進) (1610 - 1671)
 Niece: Lady Heo of the Yangcheon Heo clan (양천 허씨, 陽川 許氏)
 Sister-in-law: Lady Kim of the Seonsan Kim clan (정부인 선산 김씨)
 Niece: Royal Consort Sohun of the Yangcheon Heo clan (소훈 허씨) 
 Nephew: Heo Gwing (허굉, 許宏)
 Grandnephew: Heo Heum (허흠, 許嶔)
 Husband 
 Kim Seong-rib (김성립, 金誠立) of the Andong Kim clan (안동 김씨) (1562 - 1592)
 Father-in-law: Kim Cheom (김첨, 金瞻)
 Mother-in-law: Lady Song (송씨, 宋氏)
 Children
 Son: Kim Hui-yun (김희윤); died prematurely 
 Daughter: Lady Kim of the Andong Kim clan (안동 김씨): died prematurely 
 Adoptive son: Kim Jin (김진, 金振); son of Kim Jeong-rib (김정립, 金正立)

Writings 
A significant amount of Nanseolheon's writing was burned upon her death per her request, and the surviving poems are collected in Heo Kyeongnan's 1913 collection Nansŏrhŏn chip. The collection consists of 211 poems, in various Chinese styles. The writing of the early Joseon period (in the form of the political Sajang school and the more academic Sallim school) was heavily influenced by the Confucian literary tradition, and literature was primarily devoted to the expression of Confucian teachings. With the introduction of Tang poetry to Korea in the mid-Joseon Period,  poetry began making significant strides as an art form. Traditional Tang poetry was more formulaic and imposed prescriptive tonal guidelines. Nanseolheon's works are noted primarily for their broad range of subject matter, which is attributed in part to the drastic emotional shift evoked by her marriage.

The distinction at the time was similar to the differences between Latin composition and vernacular prose in Renaissance Europe. Her authorship of these two pieces is supported mainly by the observation that the titles of the two  pieces, "Song of Woman's Complaint" and "Song of Coloring Nails with Touch-me-not Balsam" are very similar to two verified  ( and  respectively). These claims have in part discredited by recent scholarship by O Haein and Kang Cheongseop.

Sample poems 
The poem, "Song of Autumn Night" is characteristic of her earlier, more fantastical and imagery-rich poetry. It is a seven-syllable .

"The Young Seamstress," or "Song for the Poor Girl", is one of her poems of empathy, where she sympathizes with those from poorer economic backgrounds. It is a five-syllable cheolgu.

"Woman's Grievance," another seven-syllable cheolgu, exemplifies the tone of the poetry believed to have been written after her marriage.

Gallery

Works 
 Nanseolheon jip
 Chwesawonchang

References

Bibliography 
 Choe-Wall, Yang-hi. Vision of a Phoenix: the Poems of Hŏ Nansŏrhŏn.
 Kim, Jaihiun Joyce. Classical Korean Poetry.
 Kim-Renaud, Young-Key. Creative Women of Korea: the Fifteenth through the Twentieth Centuries.
 Lee, Peter H. Anthology of Korean Literature: from Early times to the Nineteenth Century.
 Lee, Peter H. The Columbia Anthology of Traditional Korean Poetry.
 McCann, David R. Early Korean Literature: Selections and Introductions.
 McCann, David R. Form and Freedom in Korean Poetry.

External links 
 Heo Chohui 
 Memorial to the Heo Brothers and Sister 

1563 births
1589 deaths
16th-century Korean painters
16th-century Korean poets
16th-century Korean women writers
Heo clan of Yangcheon
Korean women poets
People from Gangneung